Make Way for a Lady is a 1936 romantic comedy/drama directed by David Burton, starring Herbert Marshall and Anne Shirley. June Drew (Anne Shirley) is the teenaged "lady" based on Elizabeth Jordan's novel Daddy and I.

Plot

June Drew (Anne Shirley) is the daughter of widowed Christopher Drew (Herbert Marshall), who suffers in silence as his daughter tries to "match" him with every eligible woman in sight.

Cast
 Herbert Marshall as Christopher 'Chris' Drew  
 Anne Shirley as June Drew  
 Gertrude Michael as Miss Eleanor Emerson  
 Margot Grahame as Valerie Broughton  
 Taylor Holmes as George Terry  
 Clara Blandick as Mrs. Dell, Drew's Maid  
 Frank Coghlan Jr. as Billy Hopkins  
 Maxine Jennings as Miss Marian Moore  
 Mary Jo Ellis as Mildred Jackson  
 Murray Kinnell as Doctor Barnes

References

External links 
 
 
 
 

1936 films
1930s romantic comedy-drama films
American romantic comedy-drama films
American black-and-white films
Films based on American novels
1936 comedy films
1936 drama films
RKO Pictures films
1930s English-language films
1930s American films